The Columbia Scholastic Press Association (CSPA) is an international student press association, founded in 1925, whose goal is to unite student journalists and faculty advisers at schools and colleges through educational conferences, idea exchanges, textbooks, critiques and award programs. CSPA is a program of Columbia University's School of Professional Studies.

Membership
CSPA memberships for student media are offered for print publications or online media, but not by school or chapter. The CSPA accepts newspapers, yearbooks, magazines and online media edited and produced by students in middle schools, high schools, colleges and universities for membership. Schools and colleges may be public, private or church-affiliated institutions located in the United States, Canada, or overseas schools following an American plan of education.

Memberships for student media are offered in two forms: Regular (with critique) and Associate (without critique). Both forms of media membership include eligibility for the Crown Awards and eligibility for the first 30 prepaid entries in the individual Gold Circle Awards.

Contests and critiques
"To make good writing the basis of successful student publications" was one of the earliest goals for the Columbia Scholastic Press Association. From its beginnings in 1925, the CSPA sponsored annual contests to seek out and publicize the best practices in student writing, editing and publishing. Student newspapers and magazines were the earliest formats chosen for these competitions. Student yearbooks were added in 1935. Today, online student media have been added as the technology of communications expands from print into cyberspace.

The CSPA offers several contests and a critique service for student media. The contests, including the annual Crown Awards and the Gold Circle Awards, select the best from among many entries. The Crown Awards signify overall excellence among student print and online media. The Gold Circle Awards honor the best work completed by student reporters, editors, designers, photographers, artists, poets, fiction writers, and other staff members of all types. An annual Medalist Critique is not a contest although it does provide one of several ratings to student media. The critique is a teaching tool to provide detailed guidance on how well a student print or online media is currently progressing, and how it could improve during the following year.

Conventions and workshops
Spring National Convention (held in mid March)
This three-day convention is open to student editors and faculty advisers to newspapers, yearbooks, magazines, video productions and online media from schools throughout the United States and Canada, as well as overseas schools following an American plan of education. Convention delegates can choose from separate seminars, lectures and workshops featuring professional journalists, award-winning advisers and leading student editors as presenters. Advisers can partake of three different luncheons. Students will have swap shops for networking and exchanges. And face-to-face on-site critiques will be available each day for interested staffs. The winners of the Crown Awards for top publications will be presented at the Awards Convocation on Friday afternoon.

Summer Journalism Workshop (held during the last full week of June)
This six-day live-in workshop helps staffs map out the upcoming academic year for their newspaper or online staff. The program offers newspaper and online publication courses from beginners to advanced students and faculty advisers. Most students and advisers reside on campus in air-conditioned Columbia dorms but a commuting option is available for New York City residents.

Fall Regional Conference (held during the first Monday in November)
This one-day conference helps student publications prepare for the new academic year, and covers all aspects of student publishing. The conference is open to student editors and faculty advisers to student magazines, newspapers, yearbooks and online media.

Awards to individuals
The Columbia Scholastic Press Association, and its affiliate for teachers, the Columbia Scholastic Press Advisers Association, offer awards to celebrate contributions by distinguished people in education, the media and public life. These awards are given in recognition of assistance and encouragement to student editors and faculty advisers working with them on student newspapers, magazines, yearbooks and online media in schools and colleges.

With the Gold Key, the CSPA recognizes educators and others for their support of excellence in teaching journalism and in advising the student press. The Gold Key also recognizes professionals in the media for significant contributions to student-practiced journalism. Gold Keys were first publicly presented by the CSPA in 1930.

The Joseph M. Murphy Award is given by the CSPA for outstanding service to the Association over many years. Named for the CSPA's founding director, the Murphy Award is generally given only once per year.

The Charles R. O'Malley Award for Excellence in Teaching is given by the Association for sustained achievement by a teacher of student editors or faculty advisers.

The CSPAA began its James F. Paschal Award in 1986. Named for the late director of the Oklahoma Interscholastic Press Association and editor of The CSPAA Bulletin, this honor is given for meritorious service to a state scholastic press association by one of its officials.

The Edmund J. Sullivan Award is given by the CSPAA for student journalists who have fought for the right to speak their minds while in pursuit of the truth on behalf of their audiences. The award may be given to an individual or to a group of students.

Advisers Association
Founded in 1927, the CSPAA is a professional organization of teachers/advisers devoted to the development of the student press in accordance with educational practices.

Its purposes include: to function as an autonomous unit of the CSPA; to foster the interests and promote the professional status of advisers to student publications; to encourage sympathetic teamwork between faculty advisers (as the official representatives of their publications) and the school administrators and the community; to inaugurate and publish studies of problems relative to students' publications as well as pamphlets, bulletins and monographs for advisers.

Meetings are held annually at the March CSPA Convention and at the November CSPA Conference.

Directors of the Association 
Col. Joseph M. Murphy - 1924-1969 (founding director)

Charles R. O'Malley - 1969-1981

Edmund J. Sullivan - 1981-2022 (as executive director from 2006)

References

External links
Columbia Scholastic Press Association

Scholastic Press Association